Sings Standards is a compilation album by American jazz singer Cassandra Wilson, released in 2002.

Track listing
 "Polka Dots and Moonbeams" (Jimmy Van Heusen, Johnny Burke) — 5:45  
 "I Wished on the Moon" (Ralph Rainger, Dorothy Parker) — 3:33  
 "'Round Midnight" (Thelonious Monk, Cootie Williams, Bernie Hanighen) — 5:57  
 "Angel" (Carolyn Franklin, Sonny Saunders) — 4:39  
 "I've Grown Accustomed to His Face" (Alan Jay Lerner, Frederick Loewe) — 5:14  
 "Chelsea Bridge" (Billy Strayhorn) — 6:30  
 "I'm Old Fashioned" (Jerome Kern, Johnny Mercer) — 3:06  
 "Baubles, Bangles & Beads" (Robert Wright, George Forrest) — 6:36  
 "Blue Skies" (Irving Berlin) — 3:09  
 "Blue in Green" (Miles Davis, Bill Evans) — 4:09  
 "Body and Soul" (Edward Heyman, Robert Sour, Frank Eyton, Johnny Green) — 10:39

Personnel
Cassandra Wilson – vocals, acoustic guitar
Terri Lyne Carrington – drums
Mark Johnson – drums
Kevin Bruce Harris – bass
Lonnie Plaxico – bass
Reggie Washington – bass
Mulgrew Miller – piano
James Weidman – piano
Rod Williams – piano
Jean-Paul Bourelly – guitar
Grachan Moncur III – trombone
Production notes
Jean-Paul Bourelly – producer
Steve Coleman – producer
Richard Seidel – producer
Danny Kopelson – engineer, mixing
Kevin Reeves – mastering
Mark Smith – production assistant
Hollis King – art direction
John Abbott – photography
Tom Terrell – liner notes
Ken Druker – executive producer  
Peter Pullman – editing

Chart performance

References

Cassandra Wilson albums
2002 compilation albums